Second United Presbyterian Church (also known as La Segunda Iglesia Presbyteriana Unida ; Second Church) is a historic Presbyterian church at 812 Edith Boulevard, NE in Albuquerque, New Mexico.

It was built in 1922 and added to the National Register of Historic Places in 1984.

References

External links
Official Church Website

Presbyterian churches in New Mexico
Churches on the National Register of Historic Places in New Mexico
Mission Revival architecture in New Mexico
Churches completed in 1922
Churches in Albuquerque, New Mexico
National Register of Historic Places in Albuquerque, New Mexico